The 2021 American Association season is the 16th season of professional baseball in the American Association of Professional Baseball (AA) since its creation in October 2005. There are 12 AA teams, split evenly between the North Division and the South Division.

Season schedule
After the folding of the Texas AirHogs and the loss of the St. Paul Saints to the Minnesota Twins organization, the league added the Kane County Cougars as the 11th member of the AA with the Houston Apollos serving as the 12th team, operating as a road travel team for the season. Additionally, the Kansas City T-Bones rebranded to the Kansas City Monarchs to honor the original negro league team. The league was split up into two divisions, the North and South Division. The season will be played with a 100-game schedule, with two home series and two road series inside a teams’ division, and one home series and one road series against the clubs outside its division. The top three teams in each division will qualify for the 2021 playoffs.

Regular Season Standings
Current through September 6, 2021.

 y – Clinched division
 x – Clinched playoff spot
 e – Eliminated from playoff contention

Statistical leaders
as of September 6, 2021

Hitting

Pitching

Playoff bracket

Notable players
Former Major League Baseball players who played in the American Association in 2021

 Johnny Barbato (Lincoln)
 Michael Bowden (Chicago)
 Dean Deetz (Kansas City)
 Brian Ellington (Kansas City)
 Johnny Field (Kansas City)
 Nick Franklin (Kansas City/Sioux City)
 Caleb Frare (Sioux Falls)
 Christian Friedrich (Chicago)
 Nick Gardewine (Cleburne)
 Gabriel Guerrero (Kansas City)
 Matt Hall (Kansas City)
 Donnie Hart (Winnipeg)
 David Holmberg (Milwaukee)
 Brian Johnson (Milwaukee)
 Jacob Lindgren (Kansas City)
 Michael Mariot (Cleburne)
 Ozzie Martínez (Cleburne)
 Bud Norris (Winnipeg)
 Paulo Orlando (Kansas City)
 Jacob Rhame (Cleburne)
 Keyvius Sampson (Kansas City)
 Justin Shafer (Kansas City)
 Eric Stout (Kansas City)
 Darnell Sweeney (Kansas City)
 Joey Terdoslavich (Chicago)
 Logan Verrett (Cleburne)
 David Washington (Milwaukee)
 Zack Weiss (Kansas City)
 Vance Worley (Kane County)

See also
2021 in baseball
2021 Major League Baseball season
Impact of the COVID-19 pandemic on sports

References

American Association season
American Association of Professional Baseball
American Association, 2021